Samuel Riley Pierce Jr. (September 8, 1922 – October 31, 2000) was an American attorney and politician who served as Secretary of Housing and Urban Development from January 23, 1981 until January 20, 1989, during the administration of Ronald Reagan.

Early life
Pierce Jr. was born and grew up in Glen Cove, New York. His father, also Samuel Pierce, came from Virginia to New York as a young man in 1899 during the early years of the Great Migration of Black Americans who were fleeing Jim Crow laws and poor economic opportunities. Pierce (senior) worked at the Nassau Country Club, on Long Island, for over forty years.

Pierce (Jr.) was an Eagle Scout and recipient of the Distinguished Eagle Scout Award from the Boy Scouts of America. Pierce was a member of Alpha Phi Alpha fraternity and Alpha Phi Omega service fraternity.  He was also elected to Cornell's oldest senior honor society, the Sphinx Head Society. He was a member of the New York Young Republican Club.

Pierce served in the United States Army's Criminal Investigation Division during World War II. Pierce graduated from Cornell University in 1947 and received a law degree from Cornell Law School in 1949. He earned a master of laws degree from New York University School of Law in 1952.

Political career
Pierce was an assistant United States attorney in New York from 1953 to 1955.  A lifelong Republican, he first entered government when Eisenhower was president. He became an assistant to the Undersecretary of Labor in 1955.
Pierce was appointed by Governor Nelson Rockefeller to serve as a judge of the New York City Court of General Sessions, 1959–1960. While serving in that position, he appeared on the popular game show What's My Line?. Pierce was named a partner of the law firm of Battle Fowler in 1961, the first African-American partner of a major New York firm, and was there until 1981 except for a period from 1970 through 1973 when—during the Nixon presidency—he was general counsel for the Department of the Treasury. Pierce argued before the United States Supreme Court on behalf of Martin Luther King Jr. and the New York Times in the important First Amendment case styled New York Times v. Sullivan.

In 1981, Pierce became Secretary of Housing and Urban Development under Ronald Reagan.  Pierce was Reagan's only African-American Cabinet member and the only cabinet member to serve in his post throughout both of Reagan's terms as President. On June 18, 1981 during a luncheon for the US Conference of Mayors in Washington DC, President Reagan mistook Pierce for one of the mayors on the dais, infamously greeting him, "Hello, Mr. Mayor." Due to his perceived low profile within the Reagan administration, he was sometimes derided as "Silent Sam."  During Pierce's tenure, HUD appropriations for low-income housing were cut by nearly half and funding all but ended for new housing construction. According to several former aides and HUD employees, Pierce, uninterested in his job, would often delegate important decisions to advisors and would watch television in his office.

Political scandal
After leaving office, he was investigated by the United States Office of the Independent Counsel and the United States Congress over mismanagement, abuse and political favoritism that took place in the department during his tenure. These investigations found that under Pierce's stewardship the department engaged in political favoritism and trading of influence. Millions of dollars of federal government money was given to projects sought by connected politicians of both parties, in violation of rules governing such grants and expenditures. Through the 1990s many of Pierce's closest aides and confidants at the department were charged and convicted on felony charges related to the political favoritism and inappropriate expenditures that pervaded the department during Pierce's tenure (Thomas Demery, Phillip Winn, Joseph Strauss and Deborah Gore Dean). Pierce himself was not charged, however.

Death
Pierce died at the Holy Cross Hospital outside Washington, D.C., on October 31, 2000, at the age of 78.

See also
List of African-American United States Cabinet members

Notes

References

External links
 Samuel Pierce biography
 Atlanta Journal-Constitution article from Pierce's tenure
 

1922 births
2000 deaths
20th-century American politicians
African-American members of the Cabinet of the United States
Cornell Law School alumni
New York (state) Republicans
New York University School of Law alumni
Politicians from Glen Cove, New York
Eisenhower administration personnel
Reagan administration cabinet members
Reagan administration controversies
United States Secretaries of Housing and Urban Development
United States Army personnel of World War II